Norris Roy ("Buck") Crump,  (July 30, 1904 – December 26, 1989) was a Canadian businessman and President of the Canadian Pacific Railway Limited. He was primarily responsible for converting the railroad to diesel locomotives, and expanded the company into non-transportation sectors.

Early life and education

Crump was born in Revelstoke, British Columbia. His father was a railway superintendent.  Crump joined the CPR as an apprentice machinist in 1920, when he was sixteen years old. In between working for the railway, he earned a bachelors and in 1936 a master's degree at Purdue University.

Career
After working as a track labourer and then in the machine shop, Crump was transferred to Winnipeg, where he continued to work while completing high school at night. After time off to complete a university degree, he took a position as a night foreman. He was transferred to Montreal as an assistant to the vice president, and in 1943 became Superintendent of the Ontario district. In 1948  Crump was a vice president at CPR; to counter lower numbers of passengers, he advocated increasing advertising and spending more money to make train travel attractive.

Crump was elected President in 1955; the company was severely in debt at the time. At the time the company was mainly using diesel locomotives only in the railyards; during the following twelve years, Crump oversaw the dieselisation of the railroad. He ordered the refurbishment of the company's showcase train The Canadian.

To improve profit margins Crump initiated a reorganization and expansion of the company's non-rail business.

An admirer of Samuel de Champlain, founder of Quebec City and New France, it was Crump who proposed naming the company's Montreal hotel Château Champlain after him.

In 1971 he was made a Companion of the Order of Canada and in 1974 Crump retired.

Notes

References
 Norris Roy Crump at The Canadian Encyclopedia

1904 births
1989 deaths
Canadian Pacific Railway executives
Companions of the Order of Canada
People from Revelstoke, British Columbia
Canadian chief executives